is a Japanese writer.

Life
She went to the Catholic Sacred Heart School in Tokyo after elementary school. During World War II, she evacuated to Kanazawa. After writing for the fanzines La Mancha and Shin-Shicho (新思潮: "New Thought"), she was recommended by Masao Yamakawa, an established critic at the time, to Mita Bungaku, for which she wrote Enrai No Kyaku Tachi (遠来の客たち: "Visitors from Afar"), one of the shortlisted stories for the Akutagawa Prize in 1954. In 1953, she married Shumon Miura, one of the members of Shin-Shicho.

The naming of The Bas Bleu Era (才女時代: Saijo-Jidai) by the writer and critic Yoshimi Usui described the prosperous activities of female writers including Sono and Sawako Ariyoshi—one of her contemporaries who had published many reputable books that are still being read.

In the history of Japanese literature, Sono belongs to the category of "the Third Generation" together with Shūsaku Endō, Shōtarō Yasuoka, Junnosuke Yoshiyuki, Nobuo Kojima, Junzo Shono, Keitaro Kondo, Hiroyuki Agawa, Shumon Miura, Tan Onuma, and Toshio Shimao.

She was awarded the Pro Ecclesia et Pontifice in 1979.

Sono drew criticism for a column she wrote in the Japanese far-right Sankei Shimbun newspaper in February 2015. She stated that while she was "supportive" of the "need to bring in immigrants to ease the shortage of workers to care for Japan's ballooning elderly population", she also advocated non-Asian immigrants such as whites and blacks to Japan be separated from the general population and made to live in special zones amongst themselves.

Political and social activities 
Sono is known as a conservative.
In 2000, she welcomed Alberto Fujimori, ex-President of Peru from 1990 to 2000, to stay at her house after his exile.
After the death of Ryoichi Sasakawa, one of the biggest rightist leaders, Sono took over his position as the head of the Nippon Foundation, whose funds come from 3 percent of the profits of the boat races all over Japan. As the chairperson, she had focused on welfare and assistance of undeveloped countries, until 30 June 2005, when her term of office finally expired after nine and a half years. The position of the foundation chairman was taken over by Yohei Sasakawa.
She founded an NGO named “Kaigai-senkyosha-katsudo-enjo-koenkai” (JOMAS: Japan Overseas Missionaries Assistance Society) to help Japanese missionaries devoting their lifetime in foreign countries.
She has been selected as a Person of Cultural Merits in 2003, following her husband's honor in 1999.
She was nominated as director of the Japan Post Holding Co.'s board by Shizuka Kamei, minister in charge of postal reform, in October 2009.
She was appointed to one of 15 members of an education reform panel in January 2013, a position from which she resigned in October of that year.
She believes women have no right to work after giving birth and should quit their jobs upon becoming pregnant.
 In her regular column in the Sankei Shimbun on 11 February 2015, Sono advocated that immigrants in Japan be assigned separate living zones segregated by race, citing South Africa's apartheid as an example. The comments drew widespread criticism.

Works

Novels 
Her major novels include
 Tamayura  (たまゆら: Transience), which portrays the nihilistic daily life of man and woman
 Satōgashi ga Kowareru Toki (砂糖菓子が壊れるとき: When a Sweetmeat Breaks), modeled on Marilyn Monroe and made into a film starring Ayako Wakao
 Mumeihi  (無名碑: A Nameless Monument), featuring the construction sites of the Tagokura Dam and the Asian Highway
 Kizu-tsuita-ashi  (傷ついた葦: Bruised Reed), which describes in a most dry style a life of a Catholic father
 Kyokō-no-ie  (虚構の家: The House of Fiction), a bestseller depicting domestic violence
 Tarō-Monogatari  (太郎物語: Taro Story), which features her son Taro as the protagonist
 Kami-No-Yogoreta-Te  (神の汚れた手: The Soiled Hands of the god, translated into English as  The Watcher from the Shore ), on the theme abortion and dignity of life problems, with a gynecologist as the protagonist
 Tenjō-no-ao  (天上の青: Heavenly Blue, translated into English as  No Reason for Murder , a crime novel based on real serial murder and rape cases by a man named Kiyoshi Ōkubo, which tries to describe the extremity of love
 Kyō-ō-Herode  (狂王ヘロデ: Herod the Mad), which portrays the half life of Herod the Great, who is notorious for the Massacre of the Innocents, through the eye of a mute lute player called "Ana" (hole).
 Aika  (哀歌: Lamentations), a record of the dramatic experience of a nun Haruna, who encountered the Rwanda Genocide.
 Kiseki  (奇蹟: Miracles, translated into English as  Miracles: A Novel ), a work of travel fiction set in Poland and Italy in pursuit of the miracles ascribed to St. Maximilian Kolbe

Short stories 
Nagai-kurai-fuyu (長い暗い冬: Long, Dark Winter), which is known as a masterpiece and anthologized often
Rakuyō-no-koe (落葉の声: The Voice of Falling Leaves), which describes the end of Father Maximilian Kolbe
Tadami-gawa (只見川: The River Tadami), which sings of a love torn apart by World War II

Essays 
The two million bestseller  Dare-no-tame-ni-aisuruka?  (誰のために愛するか: For Whom Do You Love?)
 Kairō-roku  (戒老録: A note of Admonition to the Old) on the way how we behave in old age
 II-hito-o-yameruto-raku-ni-naru  (「いい人」をやめると楽になる: Stop Being ”Nice”, and You'll Be Liberated), a collection of epigrams
 "Ningen no Bunzai." A collection of writings.

References

External links 
 J'Lit | Authors : Ayako Sono | Books from Japan

1931 births
Living people
Japan Post Holdings
Japanese essayists
20th-century Japanese novelists
21st-century Japanese novelists
Japanese women short story writers
Japanese nationalists
Japanese philanthropists
Japanese Roman Catholics
Pan-Asianism
Roman Catholic writers
Writers from Tokyo
20th-century Japanese short story writers
21st-century Japanese short story writers
20th-century essayists
21st-century essayists
University of the Sacred Heart (Japan) alumni